The 2019 Alaska Aces season was the 33rd season of the franchise in the Philippine Basketball Association (PBA).

Key dates

2018
December 16: The 2018 PBA draft took place in Midtown Atrium, Robinson Place Manila.

Draft picks

Roster

  also serves as Alaska's board governor.

Philippine Cup

Eliminations

Standings

Game log

|-bgcolor=ffcccc
| 1
| February 3
| Rain or Shine
| L 72–85
| Jeron Teng (15)
| Jake Pascual (9)
| Jeron Teng (3)
| Mall of Asia Arena
| 0–1
|-bgcolor=ccffcc
| 2
| February 6
| Columbian
| W 94–72
| Carl Bryan Cruz (20)
| Jake Pascual (13)
| Baclao, Banchero (4)
| Mall of Asia Arena
| 1–1
|-bgcolor=ccffcc
| 3
| February 13
| Blackwater
| W 103–101
| Cruz, Teng (18)
| Chris Exciminiano (9)
| Chris Banchero (16)
| Mall of Asia Arena
| 2–1

|-bgcolor=ffcccc
| 4
| March 1
| Phoenix
| L 80–94
| Jeron Teng (23)
| Jeron Teng (9)
| Simon Enciso (8)
| Mall of Asia Arena
| 2–2
|-bgcolor=ccffcc
| 5
| March 3
| Barangay Ginebra
| W 104–78
| Simon Enciso (23)
| Ayaay, Teng (7)
| Chris Banchero (8)
| Ynares Center
| 3–2
|-bgcolor=ffcccc
| 6
| March 9
| Magnolia
| L 86–103
| Chris Banchero (26)
| Jeron Teng (12)
| Simon Enciso (5)
| Ynares Center
| 3–3
|-bgcolor=ffcccc
| 7
| March 13
| NLEX
| L 70–91
| Jeron Teng (23)
| Nonoy Baclao (10)
| Ayaay, Banchero, Potts, Teng (2)
| Smart Araneta Coliseum
| 3–4
|-bgcolor=ffcccc
| 8
| March 15
| TNT
| L 78–92
| Carl Bryan Cruz (19)
| Jake Pascual (10)
| Chris Banchero (4)
| Cuneta Astrodome
| 3–5
|-bgcolor=ccffcc
| 9
| March 20
| Meralco
| W 92–77
| Jeron Teng (16)
| Chris Banchero (11)
| Banchero, Enciso, Teng, Thoss (3)
| Smart Araneta Coliseum
| 4–5
|-bgcolor=ffcccc
| 10
| March 24
| San Miguel
| L 96–114
| Chris Banchero (22)
| Jeron Teng (10)
| Banchero, Enciso (5)
| Smart Araneta Coliseum
| 4–6
|-bgcolor=ffcccc
| 11
| March 27
| NorthPort
| L 84–94
| Carl Bryan Cruz (23)
| Sonny Thoss (10)
| Simon Enciso (5)
| Smart Araneta Coliseum
| 4–7

Playoffs

Bracket

Game log

|-bgcolor=ccffcc
| 1
| April 5
| NLEX
| W 88–80
| Sonny Thoss (21)
| Jeron Teng (7)
| Simon Enciso (6)
| Mall of Asia Arena
| 1–0

|-bgcolor=ffcccc
| 1
| April 7
| Phoenix
| L 76–91
| JVee Casio (19)
| Nonoy Baclao (7)
| Baclao, Cruz, Teng (2)
| Mall of Asia Arena
| 0–1

Commissioner's Cup

Eliminations

Standings

Game log

|-bgcolor=ccffcc
| 1
| May 19
| Columbian
| W 111–98
| Chris Daniels (25)
| Chris Daniels (16)
| Simon Enciso (8)
| Mall of Asia Arena
| 1–0
|-bgcolor=ffcccc
| 2
| May 22
| NorthPort
| L 81–103
| Chris Daniels (21)
| Chris Daniels (13)
| Jeron Teng (4)
| Ynares Center
| 1–1
|-bgcolor=ffcccc
| 3
| May 25
| TNT
| L 85–99
| Chris Daniels (23)
| Chris Daniels (19)
| Simon Enciso (6)
| Smart Araneta Coliseum
| 1–2
|-bgcolor=ccffcc
| 4
| May 29
| NLEX
| L 87–100
| Jeron Teng (20)
| Jeron Teng (15)
| Banchero, Daniels, Enciso (5)
| Mall of Asia Arena
| 2–2

|-bgcolor=ccffcc
| 5
| June 5
| Magnolia
| W 103–80
| Chris Daniels (23)
| Jeron Teng (12)
| Chris Banchero (11)
| Smart Araneta Coliseum
| 3–2
|-bgcolor=ccffcc
| 6
| June 9
| Meralco
| W 93–89
| Chris Banchero (23)
| Chris Banchero (9)
| Banchero, Enciso (4)
| Ynares Center
| 4–2
|-bgcolor=ffcccc
| 7
| June 15
| Phoenix
| L 76–78
| Chris Banchero (18)
| Vic Manuel (7)
| Chris Banchero (6)
| Smart Araneta Coliseum
| 4–3
|-bgcolor=ffcccc
| 8
| June 21
| San Miguel
| L 107–119
| Chris Banchero (26)
| Chris Daniels (22)
| Chris Banchero (6)
| Cuneta Astrodome
| 4–4
|-bgcolor=ffcccc
| 9
| June 30
| Barangay Ginebra
| L 106–118
| Chris Banchero (29)
| Diamon Simpson (22)
| Simon Enciso (5)
| Smart Araneta Coliseum
| 4–5

|-bgcolor=ffcccc
| 10
| July 6
| Rain or Shine
| L 84–86
| Chris Banchero (24)
| Diamon Simpson (23)
| Chris Banchero (9)
| Mall of Asia Arena
| 4–6
|-bgcolor=ffcccc
| 11
| July 14
| Blackwater
| L 104–112
| Diamon Simpson (24)
| Diamon Simpson (16)
| Diamon Simpson (8)
| Smart Araneta Coliseum
| 4–7

Playoffs

Bracket

Game log

|-bgcolor=ccffcc
| 1
| July 21
| TNT
| W 108–72
| Simpson, Teng (15)
| Diamon Simpson (19)
| Simon Enciso (5)
| Smart Araneta Coliseum
| 1–0
|-bgcolor=ffcccc
| 2
| July 24
| TNT
| L 93–104
| Simon Enciso (24)
| Diamon Simpson (16)
| Chris Banchero (9)
| Smart Araneta Coliseum
| 1–1

Governors' Cup

Eliminations

Standings

Game log

|-bgcolor=ffcccc
| 1
| September 20
| Columbian
| L 110–117
| Justin Watts (40)
| Justin Watts (14)
| Enciso, Watts (4)
| Mall of Asia Arena
| 0–1
|-bgcolor=ffcccc
| 2
| September 22
| Barangay Ginebra
| L 83–102
| Justin Watts (22)
| Justin Watts (12)
| Simon Enciso (3)
| Smart Araneta Coliseum
| 0–2
|-bgcolor=ffcccc
| 3
| September 29
| San Miguel
| L 83–109
| JVee Casio (16)
| Chris Banchero (11)
| Chris Banchero (5)
| Sta. Rosa Multi-Purpose Complex
| 0–3

|-bgcolor=ffcccc
| 4
| October 4
| Meralco
| L 75–101
| Banchero, Enciso (12)
| Franko House (11)
| Franko House (6)
| Mall of Asia Arena
| 0–4
|-bgcolor=ffcccc
| 5
| October 6
| Magnolia
| L 90–95
| Vic Manuel (22)
| Franko House (13)
| Chris Banchero (6)
| Smart Araneta Coliseum
| 0–5
|-bgcolor=ccffcc
| 6
| October 13
| Rain or Shine 
| W 78–71 
| Franko House (22)
| Franko House (23) 
| Chris Banchero (6) 
| Smart Araneta Coliseum 
| 1–5
|-bgcolor=ffcccc
| 7
| October 18
| TNT 
| L 93–99 (OT) 
| Casio, House (16) 
| Franko House (13) 
| Casio, Banchero (4) 
| Ynares Center 
| 1–6
|-bgcolor=ccffcc
| 8
| October 26
| Blackwater
| L 101–91
| Jeron Teng (19)
| Franko House (11)
| Chris Banchero (7)
| Smart Araneta Coliseum
| 2–6

|-bgcolor=ccffcc
| 9
| November 3
| NorthPort
| W 106–99
| House, Manuel (23)
| Franko House (11)
| Simon Enciso (8)
| Smart Araneta Coliseum
| 3–6
|-bgcolor=ccffcc
| 10
| November 13
| Phoenix
| W 105–102
| Vic Manuel (20)
| Franko House (18)
| Simon Enciso (7)
| Smart Araneta Coliseum
| 4–6
|-bgcolor=ccffcc
| 11
| November 20
| NLEX
| W 106–90
| Franko House (24)
| Franko House (8)
| Franko House (5)
| Ynares Center
| 5–6

Playoffs

Bracket

References

Alaska Aces (PBA) seasons
Alaska Aces